Etoglucid is a drug used in chemotherapy. It is an epoxide compound.

References

Antineoplastic drugs
Epoxides
Ethers